The 2006–07 Serie B season is the 75th season since its establishment in 1929. It started on 9 September 2006 and ended on 10 June 2007. The 22 clubs in Serie B each played 42 matches during the regular season. The 2006–07 season marked the first Serie B appearance for two clubs, Frosinone and then 27-time Italian champions Juventus, whose involvement in the league was a direct result of not winning competition in the previous Serie A season and the Calciopoli rulings. 

A.C. Arezzo began the season with a six-point deficit and Juventus a nine-point deficit, due to their involvement in the 2006 Italian football scandal. In addition, U.S. Triestina Calcio were docked one point because of financial irregularities, and Pescara Calcio were penalized one point for late tax payments.

Events

Promotions 
Despite the large deficit at the start of the league, Juventus coasted through the season with ease and became the first team mathematically promoted to the Serie A for the 2007–08 season with a 5–1 away win at Arezzo on 19 May 2007, with three games remaining in the schedule. One week later, they clinched the title of Serie B champions for 2006–07 with a 2–0 home win against Mantova. Juventus were awarded the first-ever Ali della Vittoria (Wings of Victory) Cup, designed this year for the winner of the Serie B championship.

On the last day of the season Napoli played Genoa. Napoli only needed a draw for automatic promotion, while Genoa needed a win to guarantee promotion. The match ended 0–0 and Napoli were promoted. However, Piacenza only managed a 1–1 draw with Triestina, leaving it ten points behind Genoa. A gap of ten or more points between the third and fourth-placed teams meant that no playoffs would be held, and Genoa became the third team promoted to Serie A.

Both Napoli and Genoa were promoted from Serie C1 to Serie B, and from Serie B to Serie A in successive seasons.

Relegations 
On 12 May 2007 Pescara became the first team mathematically relegated to Serie C1 for the 2007–08 season with a 3–1 loss at Piacenza on Day 38 of the schedule. One week later, Crotone was also mathematically relegated with a 2–0 loss at Trieste. On the last match day, Arezzo became the third team relegated despite winning 3–1 at Treviso, as both Spezia and Hellas Verona won their games. Tied 2–2 with Juventus, Spezia was only seconds away from relegation, but a dramatic goal on the 91st minute by Nicola Padoin condemned Arezzo and qualified Spezia for the playoffs.

The fourth team to be relegated was decided in a two-legged playoff between Verona and Spezia. The first leg ended in a 2–1 win for Spezia, and a 0–0 tie in the return match condemned Verona to play Serie C1 in the 2007–08 season.

Teams 
These are the 22 teams which took part in the Serie B 2006–07:

Final classification

Results

Relegation play-off 
First leg: 15 June, Stadio Alberto Picco, La Spezia
Second leg: 21 June, Stadio Marcantonio Bentegodi, Verona

Verona relegated to 2007–08 Serie C1

Top goalscorers 
Last updated 10 June 2007

References

External links 
 2006–07 Serie B Squads Football Squads

Serie B seasons
2006–07 in Italian football leagues
Italy